The Lizard is the second album of American rock band Saigon Kick, released on June 2, 1992 through Third Stone/Atlantic.

Release
The track "Body Bags" was featured on the soundtrack to the 1993 crime TV film Beyond the Law.

Critical reception

Billboard considered the stylistic diversity of The Lizard the album's strength, writing "Elements of the Beatles, Led Zeppelin, and virtually every band in between fuel Saigon Kick's second release, which packs a more well-rounded punch than 1991's debut", and called the song "God of 42nd Street" the album's "best cut".

Track listing

Personnel

Saigon Kick
 Matt Kramer – vocals, cover concept
 Jason Bieler –  guitar, vocals, keyboard, production
 Tom DeFile – bass
 Phil Varone – drums, percussion

Technical personnel
 Ronny Lahti – engineering, mixing
 George Marino – mastering
 Sheila Rock – photography
 Tim Gavin – logo design
 Ronald Bonkert – cover art
 Jonathan Shaw – cover art
 Bob Defrin – art direction
 Larry Freemantle – art direction
 Adam Blumenthal – handwriting
 Derek Oliver – 2018 reissue liner notes

Chart positions

Certifications and sales figures
On November 20, 1996 the Recording Industry Association of America honored the band for selling 500,000 units of the album with the certification of a gold award.

References

Saigon Kick albums
1992 albums
Atlantic Records albums